Crinum angustifolium, commonly known as the field lily, is a species of the family Amaryllidae native to northern Australia.

References

Flora of Queensland
angustifolium
Plants described in 1810